Brooke Graeme Keith Walker (born 25 March 1977) is a former New Zealand cricketer. He played five Test matches and 11 One Day Internationals. Walker attended Macleans College. He was born in Auckland.

Playing career
Walker's first-class and List A career started in the 1997–98 New Zealand domestic season. Walker made his debut for New Zealand against South Africa in November 2000. He played domestic cricket for Auckland. Later in his career he was the Auckland captain, leading them to three domestic championships. He retired from all cricket in June 2005.

References

External links
 

1977 births
Living people
Auckland cricketers
New Zealand One Day International cricketers
New Zealand Test cricketers
New Zealand cricketers
People educated at Macleans College
North Island cricketers